"Somebody Out There" is the fourth and lead single from Australian singer Kate Alexa's debut album Broken & Beautiful. It was released in Australia on 4 September 2006 as a CD single and digital download. It became Alexa's fourth top thirty hit in Australia, and its music video was well received. Although not Alexa's most successful single, it is considered her signature song, and is included on Now Spring 2006.

Recording and theme
Alexa started writing the song on an acoustic guitar, with Jim Marr and Wendy Page. Alexa states "Jim and Wendy are great". We got to know each other when we wrote "My Day Will Come", so it was nice to work together again.". Alexa states "When I wrote Somebody Out There, I had just started a new relationship. I was in LA writing, and my somebody out there was in Australia. One line sums it up for me "A thousand miles, a million smiles, how many more to go? I was thousands of miles away, meeting lots of people, but I couldn't wait to get home. Of course you can look at this song another way that there's somebody out there for everybody".

Track listing
 "Somebody Out There" – 3:09

Chart performance
It entered the ARIA Singles Chart at #33 and rose to its peak of #21 in its fourth week of charting, and stayed on the ARIA top 50 for five weeks

Uses
The video of the song is featured on an episode of H2O: Just Add Water called "Visions", where Emma's brother Elliot is trying to ask Cleo's sister Kim out on a date, and she asks him to move out the way so she can watch the video.

In Neighbours the song was featured, when Samantha Fitzgerald was playing it in her house also when Bridget Parker and Declan Napier when they went on their first date to the cinema.

References

2006 singles
Kate Alexa songs